The DeKalb Avenue station is a station on the BMT Brighton Line and BMT Fourth Avenue Line of the New York City Subway, located at the intersection of DeKalb and Flatbush Avenues in Downtown Brooklyn. It is served by the Q and R trains at all times, the B train on weekdays, and the D and N trains during late nights. During rush hours only, a few W train trips also serve this station.

The station has six tracks and two island platforms. The two innermost tracks are used by Fourth Avenue express trains, which skip the station, while the four outer tracks are used by Brighton Line and Fourth Avenue local trains.

History 

This station opened on June 22, 1915, and was completed on August 1, 1920. Since it opened, DeKalb Avenue has been referred to as "the heart of the BMT", as it is a major transfer point between BMT services with lines splitting north and south of the station. Platform extensions were built into a curve south of the station in 1927 to allow for longer trains. They were closed and replaced by straight extensions to the north in 1960. The abandoned portions can be seen from the open platforms and trains.

Track configuration

The station has been reconfigured a number of times. The current configuration dates from a 1956–1961 reconstruction project to straighten the platforms and eliminate a level junction north of the station, which had caused a switching bottleneck; a station at Myrtle Avenue was closed as part of the renovation. Other plans, such as connections to the BMT Fulton Street Line and IRT Eastern Parkway Line, were considered at times.

An early plan called the Ashland Place Connection would have allowed trains on the elevated BMT Fulton Street Line to run into the subway through DeKalb Avenue, making the bottleneck even worse. This was not built, in part because the city was more interested in building its own system, the IND. However, a whole new subway was also planned, splitting from this line and heading under the East River to the BMT Broadway Line at City Hall. This plan was considered in various forms between late 1916 and 1926. Because of this, the DeKalb Avenue station was also built with provisions for a possible track connection to Nevins Street station.

The city government took over the BMT's operations on June 1, 1940. Until the mid-1950s, the extreme outside tracks in each direction hosted the Fourth Avenue Line local tracks and the next pair hosted the Brighton Line. The middle tracks, which bypassed the station, hosted the Fourth Avenue express tracks. A group of level crossovers at the northern end of the station allowed all tracks access to both sides of the Manhattan Bridge and to the Montague Street Tunnel. The Fourth Avenue local tracks led straight onto the Manhattan Bridge west of the station, while the Brighton line tracks led straight to the Montague Street Tunnel, so the crossovers allowed trains from both lines to switch between the bridge and the tunnel. This led to so many train delays on the Fourth Avenue and Brighton lines that in 1952, the junction was earmarked for "top priority" reconstruction.

On November 30, 1955, the New York City Transit Authority sent a recommendation to the Board of Estimate for the approval of a $13,152,831 contract to eliminate the bottleneck. The elimination of the bottleneck was the first step in a larger plan to improve transit service between Brooklyn and Manhattan.

During the reconstruction of the junction that started in 1956 and was completed by April 1961, the Brighton Line tracks were connected to the DeKalb Avenue station's outermost tracks. A diamond crossover north of the station had caused frequent bottlenecks, but was removed during the realignment and replaced with two flying junctions. All switches immediately north of the station were eliminated. The junction towards the Manhattan Bridge was rebuilt. To make room for a new flying junction, the Myrtle Avenue station was closed. That station's northbound platform remains visible from passing trains, but the southbound platform was demolished to accommodate the new flying junction that replaced the diamond crossover. Platforms were also doubled in length to accommodate ten-car trains of  cars. It was estimated that the reconstruction of the junction increased the junction's train capacity by 25%. The Chrystie Street Connection project was also tied to this improvement, as it resulted in more trains using the bridge, as well as connecting trains to the IND Sixth Avenue Line (and thus, to IND lines to the Bronx and Queens). Over the years, as more of the business community migrated to Midtown Manhattan, the slower tunnel route via Lower Manhattan became less popular, and it is now the least used of the three northbound routing options.

Station overhauls 

After the 1961 reconstruction period, some adjustments were made to the station. In the mid 1960s, the station platforms were extended northward at least  to accommodate for a  train. It also added new '60s modern look tiling.

DeKalb Avenue received another overhaul in the 1970s where the station's structure and over all appearance were improved. The MTA fixed and replaced wall tiles, old signs, and incandescent lighting to the 1970s modern look wall tiles, signs and fluorescent lights. Staircases and platform edges were also fixed. In spite of the renovation, however, the Metropolitan Transportation Authority listed the station among the 69 most deteriorated stations in the subway system in 1981.

In the early 2000s, architect Lee Harris Pomeroy designed a renovation of the DeKalb Avenue station. The plans included adding elevators for ADA accessibility, as well as restoring the original station tiles and mosaics. The latest major overhaul was in 2004–2006. The station was repaired and became an ADA-accessible station. The MTA repaired the staircases, retiled the walls, added new tiles to the floors, upgraded the station's lights and public address system, installed ADA yellow safety treads along the platform edge and replaced the trackbeds for all trains entering or bypassing the station. It also installed elevators on both platforms, as well as elevators to the street level.

Station layout

This underground station has six tracks with island platforms between the two outer pairs of tracks, while the two center tracks bypass the station. The platform columns are painted red on their lower halves and cream on their upper halves.

Exits

This station has two entrances/exits, each with access to either the east or west side of Flatbush Avenue. The staffed exit is near the south end and has two staircases and one elevator from each platform that go up to a waiting area above the platforms and tracks that contains two restrooms open from 5:00 a.m. to midnight. Outside of the turnstile bank is a token booth, a single street stair to the southwest corner of DeKalb Avenue and the Flatbush Avenue Extension built inside a store front, and two staircases that meet at their landings and an elevator that go up to the southeast corner outside a former Applebee's restaurant. The centers of the platforms have a crossover that connects them both. Both the crossover and the staffed exit were part of a wide mezzanine area, but most of the mezzanine was closed off and converted to crew rooms.

The other entrance/exit is at the station's extreme north end and is unstaffed. An up-only escalator and long staircase from each platform goes up to a mezzanine above the tracks. Two pairs of exit-only turnstiles and one set of four turnstiles provide entrance/exit from the system. This entrance has two street stairs: one to Fleet Street on the east side, outside Long Island University Brooklyn, and the other to the former Albee Square on the west side, outside the City Point development.

Both fare control areas feature a 2005 artwork called DeKalb Improvisation by Stephen Johnson. It consists of a large mural in the main fare control area and several smaller ones in the secondary one.

Track layout
North of the station, the outer and bypass tracks head towards the Manhattan Bridge to Manhattan with a flying junction, where express trains can use either the north side of the bridge via the Chrystie Street Connection to the IND Sixth Avenue Line or the south side of the bridge to the BMT Broadway Line. Trains traveling through this interlocking are frequently delayed, since Brighton and Fourth Avenue trains have to cross over each other to use both the Broadway and Sixth Avenue Lines. Local trains continue on the middle tracks north along the BMT Fourth Avenue Line into the Montague Street Tunnel towards the BMT Broadway Line or the BMT Nassau Street Line, the latter of which is unused in revenue service.

South of the station, the bypass tracks become the express tracks on the Fourth Avenue Line. The four remaining tracks become six tracks at a flying junction. Trains headed south on the tunnel local tracks or outer tracks proceed to the BMT Brighton Line or switch from those two tracks and provide the route to the Fourth Avenue Line local tracks. In the current service pattern, the tunnel route is not used for Brighton Line trains.

The station has a shortened mezzanine because room was needed for a proposed Lafayette Avenue line. The subway connection was never built. North of this station, near the Manhattan Bridge, there is a provision for a never-built loop back to southern Brooklyn without crossing the Manhattan Bridge into Manhattan. Bellmouths for the unbuilt loop are visible from passing trains. South of this station, a junction was built at Fulton Street for a never-built branch to run via Lafayette Avenue and Broadway.

Service patterns

References

Further reading 
 "Plans New Transit Tube to Brooklyn", New York Times December 7, 1919; page E1

External links 

 
 
 
 Station Reporter — B Train
 Station Reporter — Q Train
 Station Reporter — R Train
 The Subway Nut — DeKalb Avenue Pictures
 MTA's Arts For Transit — DeKalb Avenue (BMT Fourth Avenue Line)
 DeKalb Avenue (east of Flatbush Avenue Extension) entrance from Google Maps Street View
 DeKalb Avenue (west of Flatbush Avenue Extension) entrance from Google Maps Street View
 Fleet Street entrance from Google Maps Street View
 Northbound platform from Google Maps Street View
 Southbound platform from Google Maps Street View

BMT Brighton Line stations
BMT Fourth Avenue Line stations
New York City Subway stations in Brooklyn
Railway stations in the United States opened in 1915
1915 establishments in New York City
New York City Subway transfer stations
Downtown Brooklyn
New York City Subway stations at university and college campuses